Hank Zipzer's Christmas Catastrophe is a 2016 standalone British Christmas television film, that appeared during Season three of the Hank Zipzer (TV series). It is an adaptation of the  Hank Zipzer book series by American actor Henry Winkler and children's book author Lin Oliver.  HBO Max began streaming Hank Zipzer's Christmas Catastrophe on December 2, 2022.

Plot
It is Christmas and the Zipzer family are preparing for a new baby. Meanwhile, Mr. Rock's Rudolph the Rock 'n' Roll Reindeer is soon turned into a one-woman Christmas Carol by Miss Adolf. Mr. Joy hates Christmas and wants to cancel it altogether but Hank causes a Christmas catastrophe. His catastrophe leads to his friends being arrested, and a Christmas tree nearly gets plummeted into a crowd. But will everything go to plan before Hank's new baby brother is born?

Cast

Production
The film is written by Joe Williams and Debbie Isitt, and directed by Matt Bloom. It is produced by Kindle Entertainment in association with Walker Productions and DHX Media with support from Screen Yorkshire's Yorkshire Content Fund.

Production on Hank Zipzer's Christmas Catastrophe began on 26 July 2016 and ended on 18 August 2016. The film was commissioned by Cheryl Taylor, Controller of CBBC. The executive producers for the film are BBC's Amy Buscombe and Anne Brogan, the writers are Joe Williams and Debbie Isitt, who had written the three films of the Nativity series, and the director is Matt Bloom.

Release
The film aired on CBBC on 12 December 2016. HBO Max began streaming Hank Zipzer's Christmas Catastrophe on December 2, 2022.

Awards and nominations
The film was nominated for an International Emmy Kids award under the category of TV Movie/Mini-Series and a BAFTA children’s award in 2017. The film then won the aforementioned International Emmy Kids award in the award’s ceremony the next year. The film was also nominated for numerous other awards.

See also 
 List of Christmas films

References

External links
Hank Zipzer's Christmas Catastrophe - HBO Max
Hank Zipzer's Christmas Catastrophe  - BBC iPlayer (only available in the U.K.)

Home for Christmas - Official Music Video - CBBC
Henry Winkler Interview - Hank Zipzer - CBBC, December 1, 2016

British Christmas comedy films
2016 television films
2016 films
2010s Christmas films
2010s Christmas comedy films
Christmas television films
2010s English-language films
2010s British films